The Lovers of an Old Criminal  is a 1927 Czechoslovak comedy film directed by Svatopluk Innemann.

Cast
Jan W. Speerger as Pardon
Vlasta Burian as  Cyril Pondělíček / Alois Kanibal
Anny Ondra as Fifi Hrazánková (as Anny Ondráková)
Emilie Nitschová as Fifi's Mother
Jiří Hron as  Fifi's Admirer
Betty Kysilková as Štefanie Lesczynská
Věra Hlavatá as Olga Lesczynská
Jindřich Plachta as Kristián
Rudolf Sůva as Alois Pivoňka
František Černý as Gardener
Jarka Pižla as Gardener's Helper
Ladislav H. Struna as Apache
Elsa Vetešníková as Apachewoman
Frantisek Juhan as Fifi's Chauffeur
Ferry Seidl as Doorman

Release
The film was reconstructed in 2008 and re-released in cinemas with live music by Neuvěřitelno in 2015. The film was released on DVD by Czech Film Archive in 2015.

References

External links
 

1927 films
1927 comedy films
Czechoslovak black-and-white films
Czech silent films
Czechoslovak comedy films
1920s Czech-language films